Amorim is a suburban area in Póvoa de Varzim, Portugal. It is an ancient ecclesiastical parish and former civil parish.  It is bordered by Aver-o-Mar to the west and by Terroso to the east. In the census of 2001, it had a population of 2,856 inhabitants and a total area of 5.65 km². In 2013, it was amalgamated in the civil parish known as União das Freguesias de Aver-o-Mar, Amorim e Terroso.

Amorim is derived from Latin, and means dating/love or couples place. The Portuguese surnames Amorim and Morim can be traced to this parish. It is popular in the city for its bread, characteristically eaten at high temperatures just after being made – the Broa de Amorim.

History

The parish is known to exist from, at least, the 11th century onward.  The name of the parish Santiago de Amorim first appeared in 1033.

Amorim belonged to Barcelos until 1836 when it was transferred to Vila do Conde. Póvoa de Varzim and Vila do Conde made parish transfers in 1853, and Amorim was made part of Póvoa de Varzim since then.

In 1922, the locality of A Ver-o-Mar became an independent parish.

Geography
Amorim is located just east of the city of Póvoa de Varzim; and borders Navais to the north, Terroso to the northwest, Beiriz to the southeast and Aver-o-Mar to the west.

Localities

City districts
Amorim, despite being continuous to the city, only a section of it is considered part of the city:
Parque da Cidade (eastern part)
Barreiros, Póvoa de Varzim (eastern part)

References

Former civil parishes of Póvoa de Varzim